Twilight Town is the second and final album by American country music singer and former American football player Mike Reid. It was released in 1992 via Columbia Records. It includes the singles "Keep On Walkin'" and "Call Home", which respectively reached Nos. 45 and 43 on the U.S. country singles chart.  It closes with his own version of "I Can't Make You Love Me," which he and collaborator Allen Shamblin wrote for Bonnie Raitt, and which has been covered by many other performers.

Track listing
"A Man with a Hammer" (Reid, Allen Shamblin) – 2:51
"Some Somebody" (Reid, Troy Seals, Rhonda Gunn) – 4:01
"Back in the Fire" (Reid, Rory Michael Bourke) – 3:36
"Keep On Walkin'" (Reid, Amanda McBride) – 3:00
"Call Home" (Reid, Seals) – 3:36
"Hurtin' Side" (Reid, Bourke) – 3:25
"Workin' with the Right Tools" (Reid, Kent Robbins) – 3:46
"One Night" (Reid, Seals) – 3:26
"I'll Never Have the Heart to Leave This Town" (Reid, Steve Seskin) –  4:27
"Love Without Mercy" (Reid, Don Pfrimmer) – 4:05
"I Can't Make You Love Me" (Reid, Shamblin) – 4:12

Chart performance

References

External links
ASCAP search results for Mike Reid

1992 albums
Mike Reid (singer) albums
Columbia Records albums